Olié Koffi Kan Tobie (born 7 June 1984) is an Ivorian footballer who last played Moroccan side Hassania Agadir.

Career
Olie won with Africa Sports 2008 the Côte d'Ivoire Premier Division. He scored 21 goals in 34 games for Africa Sports and signed in January 2009 for Société Omnisports de l'Armée, for which he scored five goals in the first eight games.

References

1984 births
Living people
Ivorian footballers
Africa Sports d'Abidjan players
Ivorian expatriate sportspeople in Tunisia
Société Omnisports de l'Armée players
Expatriate footballers in Egypt
Zamalek SC players
Club Africain players
Ivorian expatriate sportspeople in Egypt
Expatriate footballers in Tunisia
ES Bingerville players
Ivorian expatriate footballers
Expatriate footballers in Morocco
Association Salé players
Ivorian expatriate sportspeople in Morocco
Egyptian Premier League players
Association football forwards